Saint Francis Church, in Fort Kochi (Fort Cochin), Kochi, originally built in 1503, is one of the oldest European churches in India and has great historical significance as a mute witness to the European colonial struggle in the subcontinent. The Portuguese explorer Vasco da Gama died in Kochi in 1524 when he was on his third visit to India. His body was originally buried in this church, but after fourteen years his remains were moved to Lisbon and now located at Jerónimos Monastery.

History
Vasco da Gama, who discovered the sea route from Europe to India, landed at Kappad near Kozhikode (Calicut) in 1498. He was followed by Pedro Álvares Cabral and Afonso de Albuquerque. They built Fort Emmanuel at the Fort Kochi Beach with permission from the Raja of Cochin. Within the fort, they built a church with a wooden structure, which was dedicated to St. Bartholomew. The neighbourhood is now known as Fort Kochi. Francisco de Almeida, the Portuguese viceroy, was allowed, in 1506, by the Raja of Cochin to reconstruct wooden buildings in stone and masonry.

The Portuguese explorer Vasco da Gama died in Kochi in 1524 on his third visit to India. His body was originally buried in this church, but after fourteen years his remains were moved to Lisbon.

The Franciscans retained control over the church till the Dutch captured Kochi in 1663. While the Portuguese were Roman Catholics,  and the Netherlands had Catholic and Protestant citizens, the Dutch government and Colonialists were Protestant. They demolished all the churches except this one.  They reconditioned it and converted it into a government church.

See also
 Christianity in India
 Church of South India
 Kochi Diocese of the Church of South India

References

External links

 St Francis Church;Colonial History of India in Stone 

Churches in Kochi
Colonial Kerala
16th-century Roman Catholic church buildings in India
Church of South India church buildings in India
Churches completed in 1503
Churches completed in 1516
1500s establishments in Portuguese India
1510s establishments in Portuguese India
Religious organizations established in the 1500s
Archaeological sites in Kerala
Portuguese in Kerala
Portuguese colonial architecture in India
Baroque church buildings in India
Monuments of National Importance in Kerala
Tourist attractions in Kochi